Pancake is a surname. People by this name include
 Ann Pancake, writer and essayist
 Breece D'J Pancake, author of short fiction
 Brooke Pancake, professional golfer
 Chet Pancake, filmmaker and musician
 Cherri M. Pancake, ethnographer and computer scientist 
 Sam Pancake, actor

See also
 Pancake (disambiguation)

English-language surnames